Balıqçı is a former village in the municipality of Qazıməmməd in the Hajigabul District of Azerbaijan.

References

Populated places in Hajigabul District